Commander Peter Ulysses "Sturgis" Turner JAGC, USN, played by Scott Lawrence, is a fictional character in the American Television series JAG.

Biography
Sturgis is a good friend and former Naval Academy classmate of Harm.  He served on submarines before becoming a lawyer and is the son of Matthew Turner (Bill Cobbs), a retired Baptist Navy chaplain. Sturgis and Harm play hoops and fix cars together. He kept secret that Mac let it slip to him "That she was in love with [Harm]." He was also accused of incompetence in a case, only to be defended unsatisfactorily by Bud, causing a rift between the two. Ironically, later on, there arise two separate situations in which each defends the other successfully - when Sturgis is accused of racism against North Koreans under arrest in a US submarine, and when Bud is accused of assault when he hits an agitated and argumentative history professor under the assumption that he was about to hit his brother, Mike. Also, Sturgis went through a bout of guilt in having played a part in getting Bud into shape enough to be assigned his tour of duty as JAG on a carrier near Afghanistan, which led to the accident whereby Bud lost a leg. Aside from Harm himself, only Bud and Sturgis have noted the similarities between Mac and Diane Schonke, a deceased Naval Academy classmate of Harm and Sturgis.

He also earned a reputation for sticking to the rules, both in the courtroom as well as in investigations, to the point of being considered sanctimonious and priggish, especially by Harm. This pattern is also seen in his brief appointment as acting JAG between the leave of Rear Admiral Chegwidden and the arrival of Major General Gordon Cresswell. This further annoys Harm, who continually berates him. This leads to great animosity between the friends, finally leading to a verbal confrontation between the two when Sturgis recommends against him in an investigation on Harm's alleged shooting down of a plane carrying an Iraqi official. Showed curiosity and support for Harm and Mac's will they/won't they relationship. In the 2003 Christmas episode, Turner met singer Varese Chestnut (Erica Gimpel), who he proceeded to date, although this seemed to only last a short while.

Later in the season an Alternate history episode (titled "What if...") showed how the lives of the main cast would have been had they made different decisions. The big change for Turner was that he was retired from the navy and was acting as his fiancée's manager, his fiancée being Varese Chestnut.

In the series finale Turner and Varese decided to try to see what could be, with her moving to Georgetown and subletting Mac's apartment from her since she was (apparently) moving to either San Diego or London.  Why Sturgis left the submarine service is never explained, although in the eighth season it is mentioned without any specific explanation that Sturgis will never be able to return to the submarine service.

Awards and decorations
The list below contains all known awards and decorations  of Commander Peter Ulyssyes "Sturgis" Turner, JAGC, USN (as of season 10).

 

Sturgis Turner was awarded the Bronze Star for destroying an Iranian submarine, commanded by a legendary Russian submarine captain, carrying a "dirty nuke" warhead that had been fired onto a battle group containing an American Aircraft Carrier. Season 7 Episode 24 Turner received his award in a ceremony at JAG HQ in the middle of the eight season. Owing to his receiving of a combat decoration, he should have received the GWOTEM for combat service in the Arabian Sea in 2002.  This error is overseen in the show.

References

JAG (TV series) characters
Television characters introduced in 2001
Fictional commanders
Fictional American lawyers
Fictional Judge Advocate General's Corps (United States) personnel
Fictional United States Navy personnel
Fictional African-American people
Fictional War in Afghanistan (2001–2021) veterans